Åryd is a locality situated in Växjö Municipality, Kronoberg County, Sweden with 684 inhabitants in 2010.

Singer Jessica G. Pilnäs who participated in Melodifestivalen 1995, finishing third, was born in Åryd.

References 

Växjö
Populated places in Kronoberg County
Populated places in Växjö Municipality
Värend